Black whale is a vernacular name for certain whales. It may be encountered as a colloquial or as a quasi-scientific term.

 In whaling jargon, the sperm whale (Physeter macrocephalus) of the Physeteridae was sometimes known as the "black whale"
 "Black whale" is a name for a presumed right whale species in the Balaenidae. It was also called "northern right whale" but has more recently been separated into:
 North Atlantic right whale (Eubalaena glacialis)
 North Pacific right whale (Eubalaena japonica)
 The Black Whale, a 1934 German film

Animal common name disambiguation pages